Castelo de Montemor-o-Novo is a castle in Portugal. It is classified as a National Monument.

Castles in Évora District
Castle Montemor